Hazro (Tercil) is a district of Diyarbakır Province of Turkey. The population is 4,488 as of 2010. In the local elections in March 2019 Ahmet Çevik from the Peoples' Democratic Party (HDP) was elected Mayor. He was dismissed in November 2019 and the District Governor Ali Öner was appointed as trustee.

References

Districts of Diyarbakır Province
Populated places in Diyarbakır Province
Kurdish settlements in Turkey